Archer Point is a rocky headland on the coast marking the west side of Harald Bay, Antarctica. It was discovered in February 1911 by Lieutenant H.L.L. Pennell, Royal Navy, in the Terra Nova, expedition ship of the British Antarctic Expedition, 1910–13, under Robert Falcon Scott, and named after W.W. Archer, chief steward of the expedition.

References

 

Headlands of Oates Land